The Ladies Club is a 1986 American rape and revenge film directed by Janet Greek (under the pseudonym A.K. Allen) and starring Karen Austin, Diana Scarwid, Christine Belford, and Bruce Davison. It follows a Los Angeles policewoman who, after suffering a rape, bands together with other rape victims, forming a group that collectively begin hunting rapists. The script by Fran Lewis Ebeling and Paul Mason was based on Casey Bishop and Betty Black's novel, The Sisterhood.

Summary
Joan Taylor is a Los Angeles policewoman who gets gang-raped by a trio of burglars in her own house. When the three rapists get caught, go to trial and get away with it through a legal technicality, Joan takes up going to women's support meetings. There, she forms an alliance with a resident doctor Constance Lewis, whose daughter was raped and killed by a sex offender, as well as a few other rape victims. Joan takes charge of the group and leads them out to abduct and surgically castrate various men who have committed rape and gotten away with it. But each of the ladies' personal problems soon get in the way.

Cast

Release and reception 
Greek had her name listed as "A.K. Allen" due to complaints over the way the finished film was marketed. Lead actress Karen Austin also complained about New Line's advertisements: "I think the way the film is being marketed is tacky," she said, referring to taglines like "Men who attack women have two big problems. The Ladies Club is about to remove them both."

Critical reception for the film was mixed, with critics praising the film for its feminist slant but criticizing it for its flat tone. At the time of its release, film critic Carrie Rickey dubbed the film "the first feminist exploitation movie." "It corrects the twisted relationship between the viewer and viewed," she noted.

References

External links

1986 films
American rape and revenge films
1986 drama films
Films scored by Lalo Schifrin
Films directed by Janet Greek
1980s English-language films
1980s American films